I Love Another is a 1946 Danish family film directed by Lau Lauritzen Jr. and Alice O'Fredericks.

Cast
 Ib Schønberg - Onkel Polle
 Marguerite Viby - Annelise 'Peter' Petersen
 Ebbe Rode - John Eriksen
 Erni Arneson - Connie Smith
 Bjørn Watt-Boolsen - Læge Preben Hansen
 Betty Helsengreen - Køkkenpigen Viola
 Henry Nielsen - Taxachauffør
 Ebba Amfeldt - Smith
 Ingeborg Pehrson - Karlsen / 'Karl'
 Helga Frier - Husholderske hos frk. Smith
 Knud Heglund - Sivertsen
 Else Colber
 Astrid Holm
 Preben Kaas - Blomsterbud
 Sigrid Horne-Rasmussen
 Benny Juhlin
 Tove Maës
 Lise Thomsen

External links

1946 films
1940s Danish-language films
Danish black-and-white films
Films directed by Lau Lauritzen Jr.
Films directed by Alice O'Fredericks
Films scored by Sven Gyldmark
Danish comedy films
1946 comedy films